Vijin-e Pain (also Romanized as Vījīn-e Pā’īn; also known as Vījīn) is a village in Hasanabad Rural District, Fashapuyeh District, Ray County, Tehran Province, Iran. At the 2006 census, its population was 114, in 28 families.

References 

Populated places in Ray County, Iran